Couple Getaway is the debut album of Hubert Wu, a Hong Kong singer, released on 14 September 2012.

Track

Editions
CD+DVD Edition
Dual Edition（Live +）; DVD includes songs Hubert performed in Neway Music Live.

Music videos

Chart performance

Hong Kong

Other charting songs

Awards
 Jade Solid Gold Selection (Round 1): The Butterfly Lovers
 Jade Solid Gold Selection (Round 3): Happiness
 IFPI (Hong Kong) :Gold Certification

Promotion

2012

References 

Hubert Wu albums
2012 debut albums